The spat (symbol S) is an obsolete unit of distance used in astronomy.

References

Units of length
Obsolete units of measurement